The Ministry of Transportation is a branch of the federal government of Nigeria responsible for watching the movement of people and goods across the country. Mu'azu Jaji Sambo is the Minister of Transportation, and (Ademola Adewole Adegoroye) is the Minister of State Transportation. They were appointed by Nigerian president Muhammadu Buhari. The ministry oversees road vehicles, aviation, and rail transport.

References

External links 
Official website

Federal Ministries of Nigeria